DK1 can refer to:

DK1 rigs, Vietnamese service stations in South China Sea
Resurs-DK No.1, Earth observation satellite
National road 1 (Poland) (Droga krajowa nr 1 in Polish)
, earliest train design in the Beijing Subway rolling stock
DK1, development kit for the head-mounted virtual reality display Oculus Rift